Clarence Hummel Wilson (November 17, 1876 – October 5, 1941) was an American character actor.

Career 

Wilson appeared in nearly 200 movies between 1920 and 1941, mostly in supporting roles as an old miser or grouch. He had supporting roles in films like The Front Page (1931; as Sheriff Pinky), Ruggles of Red Gap (1935) and You Can't Take It With You (1938). Wilson also played in several Our Gang comedies, most notably as Mr. Crutch in Shrimps for a Day and school board chairman Alonzo Pratt in Come Back, Miss Pipps, his final film.

Death
Wilson died on October 5, 1941, and he was interred at Grand View Memorial Park Cemetery in Glendale, California.

Selected filmography

 Duds (1920) - Jues
 The Penalty (1920) - A Crook (uncredited)
 The Little Grey Mouse (1920) - Henry Lealor
 Are All Men Alike? (1920)
 The Land of Jazz (1920) - Minor Role
 The First Born (1921) - Kury Lar
 While the Devil Laughs (1921) - Joe Franklin
 Oliver Twist, Jr. (1921) - Fagin
 The Tomboy (1921) - The Police Force
 Big Town Ideas (1921) - Chef
 Children of the Night (1921) - Tankerton
 Lovetime (1921) - Count de Baudine
 Queenie (1921) - Simon Pepper / Abner Quigley
 Cinderella of the Hills (1921) - Peter Poff
 The Jolt (1921) - Georgette's Father
 Gleam O'Dawn (1922) - Pierre
 Winning with Wits (1922) - Stage manager
 Extra! Extra! (1922) - Jim Rogers
 The Glory of Clementina (1922) - Vandemeer
 Honor First (1922) - Tricot (the Apache)
The Cub Reporter (1922) - Mandarin
 Youth Must Have Love (1922) - Austin Hibbard
 The Last Hour (1923) - Quales
 Soft Boiled (1923) - The Reformer
 The Hunchback of Notre Dame (1923) - Minor Role (uncredited)
 The Dangerous Maid (1923) - Jewars (Jeffreys' secretary)
 Little Robinson Crusoe (1924) - 'Singapore' Scroggs
 Young April (1926) - Flower vendor (uncredited)
 The Winning of Barbara Worth (1926) - Barber (uncredited)
 What Price Glory? (1926) - Waiter at Cafe (uncredited)
 The Silent Avenger (1927) - Dave Wade
 Mountains of Manhattan (1927) - Jim Tully
 Sunrise: A Song of Two Humans (1927) - Money Lender (uncredited)
 Uncle Tom's Cabin (1927) - Bidder at Eliza's Auction (uncredited)
 Ladies Must Dress (1927) - Office Manager
 A Girl in Every Port (1928) - Bartender in Marseille (uncredited)
 The Phantom of the Turf (1928) - The Lawyer
 Big News (1929) - Coroner
 Woman Trap (1929) - Detective Captain
 Dangerous Paradise (1930) - Zangiacomo
 Officer O'Brien (1930) - Patello's Attorney (uncredited)
 Strictly Unconventional (1930) - George - Ted's Valet (uncredited)
 Love in the Rough (1930) - Brown
 Paid (1930) - Max Hardy (uncredited)
 The Front Page (1931) - Sheriff Hartman
 Ladies' Man (1931) - H.J. Dargen (Jeweler) (uncredited)
 Sweepstakes (1931) - Mr. Emory
 Wicked (1931) - Juryman
 Night Life in Reno (1931) - Adrian Garrett
 Flying High (1931) - Lunch Counter Manager (uncredited)
 Her Majesty, Love (1931) - Uncle Cornelius
 The Sea Ghost (1931) - Henry Sykes
 Under Eighteen (1931) - A.J. Dietrich, Attorney (uncredited)
 The Beast of the City (1932) - Coroner (uncredited)
 The Wet Parade (1932) - Charles Evans Hughes Campaigner (uncredited)
 Amateur Daddy (1932) - William J. 'Bill' Hansen
 The Famous Ferguson Case (1932) - County Attorney
 Winner Take All (1932) - Ben Isaacs
 The Purchase Price (1932) - Elmer, the Justice of the Peace (uncredited)
 Jewel Robbery (1932) - Prefect of Police
 Love Me Tonight (1932) - Shirtmaker (uncredited)
 Down to Earth (1932) - Ed Eggers
 The All American (1932) - Football Game Spectator (uncredited)
 The Phantom of Crestwood (1932) - Jenny's Apartment House Manager
 The Sport Parade (1932) - Toastmaster
 The Penguin Pool Murder (1932) - Bertrand B. Hemingway
 Flaming Guns (1932) - J.P. Mulford
 Rasputin and the Empress (1932) - Minor Role (uncredited)
 20,000 Years in Sing Sing (1932) - Morris - Finn's Lawyer (uncredited)
 The Mysterious Rider (1933) - Gentry, the Barber
 Smoke Lightning (1933) - Deputy Jake Tully
 Pick-Up (1933) - Sam Foster
 The Keyhole (1933) - J. Weems - Acme Detective Agency Head (uncredited)
 Terror Aboard (1933) - Ship's Doctor
 Bondage (1933) - Dr. I. M. Harper (uncredited)
 The Girl in 419 (1933) - Walter C. Horton
 Storm at Daybreak (1933) - Captain Durosch (uncredited)
 A Shriek in the Night (1933) - Perkins - Editor
 Her First Mate (1933) - Dr. Gray (uncredited)
 Tillie and Gus (1933) - Phineas Pratt
 Day of Reckoning (1933) - Bail Bondsman (uncredited)
 Blood Money (1933) - Judge (uncredited)
 Roman Scandals (1933) - Boggs - the Museum Keeper (uncredited)
 King for a Night (1933) - Mr. Whistler
 Lady Killer (1933) - Lawyer (uncredited)
 Son of Kong (1933) - Peterson - Hilda's Father (uncredited)
 Nana (1934) - Financial Backer (uncredited)
 I Like It That Way (1934) - The Professor
 Viva Villa! (1934) - Jail Official (uncredited)
 Unknown Blonde (1934) - Max Keibel
 Love Birds (1934) - Blewitt
 Hollywood Party (1934) - Scientific Pedant (uncredited)
 Half a Sinner (1934) - Collector
 Now I'll Tell (1934) - Attorney Joe Davis
 Operator 13 (1934) - Josiah Claybourne (uncredited)
 The Old Fashioned Way (1934) - Sheriff Prettywillie (uncredited)
 Bachelor Bait (1934) - District Attorney Clement Graftsman
 Beyond the Law (1934) - Talbot
 The Count of Monte Cristo (1934) - Fouquet
 Servants' Entrance (1934) - Employment Agent (uncredited)
 The Lemon Drop Kid (1934) - Martin Potter
 Wake Up and Dream (1934) - Hildebrand
 A Successful Failure (1934) - H.T. Flintly, News Record Editor
 6 Day Bike Rider (1934) - Mr. Hemmings (uncredited)
 Gridiron Flash (1934) - Constable Hunsacker (uncredited)
 Imitation of Life (1934) - Mr. Bristol, Landlord (uncredited)
 Kentucky Kernels (1934) - Lawyer Peck (uncredited)
 Evelyn Prentice (1934) - Public Defender (uncredited)
 I'll Fix It (1934) - John Stevens
 Shrimps for a Day (1934, Short) - Mr. Crutch
 Forsaking All Others (1934) - Hotel Manager (uncredited)
 The Winning Ticket (1935) - Dolan - Pool Hall Proprietor (uncredited)
 When a Man's a Man (1935) - Garvey - Gambert's Lawyer
 Ruggles of Red Gap (1935) - Jake Henshaw
 The Whole Town's Talking (1935) - Head of Chamber of Commerce (uncredited)
 The Great Hotel Murder (1935) - Girando
 A Dog of Flanders (1935) - Antoine - Official with Court Order (uncredited)
 One Frightened Night (1935) - Mr. Felix
 Let 'Em Have It (1935) - Reynolds (uncredited)
 Lady Tubbs (1935) - Country Hick (uncredited)
 Mad Love (1935) - Piano Creditor (uncredited)
 Champagne for Breakfast (1935) - Raeburn
 Bright Lights (1935) - Train Station Clerk (uncredited)
 Navy Wife (1935) - Bridge Player (uncredited)
 His Night Out (1935) - Trimble (uncredited)
 Waterfront Lady (1935) - Truant Officer
 It's in the Air (1935) - Amos Whipple
 The Rainmakers (1935) - Hogan (uncredited)
 Little Sinner (1935, Short) - the Property owner
 Splendor (1935) - Process Server (uncredited)
 I Dream Too Much (1935) - The Lawyer (uncredited)
 Paddy O'Day (1936) - Lawyer Brewster (uncredited)
 Timothy's Quest (1936) - Mr. Simpson (uncredited)
 It's Up to You (1936) - Henry 
 Sutter's Gold (1936) - Streetcar Owner (uncredited)
 Educating Father (1936) - Jess Boynton
 Little Miss Nobody (1936) - Herman Slade
 Pepper (1936) - Aeolian (uncredited)
 Love Begins at 20 (1936) - Jonathan Ramp
 Wedding Present (1936) - Simmons (uncredited)
 The Magnificent Brute (1936) - Burke (uncredited)
 The Case of the Black Cat (1936) - Mr. Shuster
 The Man I Marry (1936) - Farmer (uncredited)
 Hats Off (1936) - Mr. Pottingham
 Man of the People (1937) - Skinny Wilson - Sulker (uncredited)
 Outcast (1937) - Pawnbroker (uncredited)
 Two Wise Maids (1937) - Twitchell
 Maytime (1937) - Waiter (uncredited)
 A Star Is Born (1937) - Justice of the Peace (uncredited)
 Damaged Goods (1937) - Dr. N.R. Shryer
 Parnell (1937) - Assistant Process Server (uncredited)
 The Great Gambini (1937) - Doctor (uncredited)
 The Emperor's Candlesticks (1937) - Stationmaster (uncredited)
 Small Town Boy (1937) - Curtis French
 The Westland Case (1937) - Charles Frazee
 Nothing Sacred (1937) - Mr. Watson (uncredited)
 45 Fathers (1937) - Grocer (uncredited)
 In Old Chicago (1938) - Lawyer
 Rebecca of Sunnybrook Farm (1938) - Jake Singer
 Kentucky Moonshine (1938) - Attorney
 Having Wonderful Time (1938) - Mr. G
 The Texans (1938) - Sam Ross (uncredited)
 You Can't Take It with You (1938) - John Blakely
 Freshman Year (1938) - Hoskins (uncredited)
 The Mad Miss Manton (1938) - Norris' Attorney (uncredited)
 Little Miss Broadway (1938)
 Son of Frankenstein (1939) - Dr. Berger (uncredited)
 Ambush (1939) - Lafe, Centerville Storekeeper (uncredited)
 I'm from Missouri (1939) - Dilson (uncredited)
 Let Us Live (1939) - Lunchroom Proprietor (uncredited)
 East Side of Heaven (1939) - Telegraph Operator (uncredited)
 Clown Princes (1939, Short) - The Farm Landlord
 Some Like It Hot (1939) - Mr. Ives
 Unmarried (1939) - Grocery Clerk (uncredited)
 Young Mr. Lincoln (1939) - Dr. Mason (scenes deleted)
 Quick Millions (1939) - Assayer
 Desperate Trails (1939) - Malenkthy Culp
 Drums Along the Mohawk (1939) - Paymaster (uncredited)
 Little Old New York (1940) - Willie Stout
 Millionaire Playboy (1940) - Mr. Jamison (uncredited)
 We Who Are Young (1940) - R. Glassford
 Haunted House (1940) - Eph, Service Station Owner
 Cherokee Strip (1940) - Barrett Lawyer (uncredited)
 Melody Ranch (1940) - Judge 'Skinny' Henderson
 Street of Memories (1940) - Professor (uncredited)
 Friendly Neighbors (1940) - Silas Barton
 Little Men (1940) - W.L. Reynolds (uncredited)
 Road Show (1941) - Sheriff (uncredited)
 Angels with Broken Wings (1941) - Sybil's Lawyer (uncredited)
 Come Back, Miss Pipps (1941, Short) - Alonzo K. Pratt (uncredited) (final film role)

References

External links

 
 
 

1876 births
1941 deaths
American male film actors
Male actors from Cincinnati
American male silent film actors
20th-century American male actors
Burials at Grand View Memorial Park Cemetery